Baahar di boli (Punjabi: ਬਾਹਰ ਦੀ ਬੋਲੀ, باہر دی بولی) means language from outside. In this context it refers to the manner in which Punjabi is spoken outside of India and Pakistan. There is no agreed term relating to how to describe the Diaspora's manner of speaking Punjabi, as it is littered with words mostly from English (to a greater extent, especially nouns, than is Punjabi in Punjab) and occasionally other languages, depending upon where the immigrants ended up. Most came to the West or South East Asia. The Western Punjabis have either settled in Great Britain (the highest concentration anywhere in the world outside of South Asia), Canada, and the States. Commonly the literature written in this type of Punjabi is referred to as Parvasi, which literally means Emigre.

Their children speak Punjabi as a second language and have codified it to the grammatical patterns of English. This has resulted in a language often referred to as Hinglish, Pinglish or Punglish. Punjabis settled in the west are known as Vilayties, and some refer to Baar di boli as Vilayti (see below). However this is a term that is used by academics in Punjab to describe the Diaspora's version of Punjabi. In reality most Occidental Punjabis do see it as Punjabi. However the differences are apparent when one reads Western Punjabi novels such as Neela Noor by Rupinderpal Singh Dhillon, or listens to Bhangra mixes by DCS and Bally Sagoo.

In their Anglo-Indian dictionary, Hobson-Jobson, published in 1886, Sir Henry Yule and Arthur C Burnell explained that the word came to be used in British India for several things the British had brought into the country, such as the tomato (whose literal translation is "foreign aubergine") and soda water, which was commonly called  ("foreign water").

There have been several studies that have proven that the Second Generation Punjabis do codify the language to English structure. A sample of children were observed in Birmingham, UK. One such study shows the importance of their heritage language to them. This was conducted by Jean Mills of Brigham University (See references Below). Ramesh Krishnamurthy carried out one of the studies on this as well. There is currently a push to teach Punjabi as a second language to the western born generation.

From their perspective it is Punjabi, Vilayti Punjabi rather than Baar Di Boli.

References

Punjabi dialects
Punjabi words and phrases